Stew Thornley (born July 23, 1955 in Minneapolis, Minnesota) is an author of books on sports history, particularly in his home state.  He is an official scorer and online gamecaster for the Minnesota Twins.  Thornley also does official scoring for Minnesota Timberwolves basketball games.

The leading historian of Minnesota sports, Thornley has authored numerous books, including:

 Holy Cow! The Life and Times of Halsey Hall (Minneapolis: Nodin Press, 1991)
 On to Nicollet: The Glory and Fame of the Minneapolis Millers (Minneapolis: Nodin Press, 1988)
 Minnesota Twins Baseball: Hardball History on the Prairie (Charleston, S.C.:The History Press, 2014)
 Baseball in Minnesota: The Definitive History (St. Paul: Minnesota Historical Society Press, 2006, revised and updated 2021)

References

External Links 
Interview with Stew Thornley, author of On to Nicollet, about the history of the Minneapolis Millers, NORTHERN LIGHTS Minnesota Author Interview TV Series #39 (1988)

Interview with Stew Thornley, author of Holy Cow! The Life and Times of Halsey Hall, interviewed by broadcaster Dave Moore, NORTHERN LIGHTS Minnesota Author Interview TV Series #177 (1991)

Interview with Stew Thornley and Ray Christensen, co-authors of Golden Memories about the Minnesota Gophers sports teams, NORTHERN LIGHTS Minnesota Author Interview TV Series #296 (1994)

Stew Thornley also interviewed authors Andy Nelson (1989), Jon Kerr (1991), Michael Fedo (1991), Ted Robinson (1992), Bill Meissner (1994), Blazin' Phil Blazovich (1998). and W.P. Kinsella (1995)

1955 births
Living people
Writers from Minneapolis
American male non-fiction writers
Historians from Minnesota